Heman Dyer (September 24, 1810 – July 29, 1900) is generally numbered as the third chancellor of the University of Pittsburgh, then called the Western University of Pennsylvania,  serving from 1836 to 1849, although McLaren's official title at the time was "Principal", a holdover from the institution's academy days.  Dyer was President of the university until, for the second time in less than five years, a major Pittsburgh fire had destroyed the university's buildings, equipment, and records.  The university subsequently suspended operations in order to rebuild and regroup and reopened in 1854.

Biography
Heman Dyer was born in Shaftsbury, Vermont on September 24, 1810.

He died in New York City on July 29, 1900.

References

Chancellors of the University of Pittsburgh
1810 births
1900 deaths